Pressure grouting or jet grouting involves injecting a grout material into otherwise inaccessible but interconnected pore or void space of which neither the configuration or volume are known, and is often referred to simply as grouting.  The grout may be a cementitious, resinous, or solution chemical mixture.    The greatest use of pressure grouting is to improve geomaterials (soil and rock).  The purpose of grouting can be either to strengthen a formation or to reduce water flow through it.  It is also used to correct faults in concrete and masonry structures.  Since first usage in the 19th century, grouting has been performed on the foundation of virtually every one of the world's large dams, in order to reduce the amount of leakage through the rock, and sometimes to strengthen the foundation to support the weight of the overlying structure, be it of concrete, earth, or rock fill.  It is also a key procedure in the creation of post-tensioned prestressed concrete, a material used in many concrete bridge designs, among other places.

References

Baker, W. H. (editor). (1982), Grouting in Geotechnical Engineering, Proceedings of the Conference on Grouting in Geotechnical Engineering, February 10–12, 1982, New Orleans, LA, ASCE, 
Borden, R. H. (editor), Holtz, R. O. (editor), and Juran, I. (editor). (1992), Grouting, Soil Improvement and Geosynthetics, Proceedings of the 1992 ASCE Specialty Conference, February, 1992, New Orleans, LA, ASCE Geotechnical Special Publication No. 30, 1480 pp., 2 vols, 
Bruce, D. A. (2005), Glossary of Grouting Terminology, J. Geotechnical and Geoenvironmental Engrg. 131 (12): 1534-1542.
Compaction Grouting Consensus Guide Committee of the Geo-Institute of the ASCE. (2010), Compaction Grouting Consensus Guide, ASCE/GI Standard 53-10, 
Johnsen, L. F. (editor), Bruce, D. A. (editor), and Byle, M. J (editor). (2003), Grouting and Ground Treatment, Proceedings of the Third International Conference, February 10–12, 2003, New Orleans, LA, ASCE Geotechnical Special Publication No. 120, 
Henn, R. W. (2003), AUA Guidelines for Backfilling and Contact Grouting of Tunnels and Shafts, ASCE Press. 
U.S. Army Corps of Engineers (1997), Chemical Grouting, 
U.S. Army corps of Engineers (2008), Grouting Technology, U.S. Army Corps of Engineers Engineer Manual, EM 1110-2-3506
Warner, J. (2004), Practical Handbook of Grouting: Soil, Rock and Structures, John Wiley & Sons, Inc. 
Weaver, K. D., and Bruce D. A. (2007), Dam Foundation Grouting, Revised and Expanded, ASCE Press. 
International Society of Rock Mechanics (1996), "Commission on Rock Grouting", Co-ordinator R. Widmann, Int. Journal of Rock Mech., Min. Sci. & Geomech., Abstr. Vol. 33. No 8. pp 803 – 847, 1996, c. 1996 Elsevier Science Ltd., 0148-9062-96  
CEN - European Committee for Standardization (2000), "EN 12715:2000, Execution of special geotechnical work, Grouting", 
Kirsch K., Bell A. (2013), "Ground Improvement", Third Edition, Chapter 5: "Permeation Grouting", CRC Press,  
Austrian Society for Geomechanics (2017), "Expert Comments to EN 12715, Grouting", https://www.oegg.at/en/the-oegg-2/publications-112/

External links
 Grouting Committee of the ASCE/GI

Geotechnical structures